Anthrax is an American thrash metal band from New York City. Formed in 1981, the group was originally a foursome consisting of guitarist Scott Ian, bassist Dan Lilker, drummer Dave Weiss and lead vocalist Joe Gelione. The band has been through many personnel changes, and currently includes rhythm guitarist Scott Ian, drummer Charlie Benante (since 1983), bassist Frank Bello (since 1984), vocalist Joey Belladonna (from 1984–1992, 2005–2007 and since 2010) and lead guitarist Jonathan Donais (since 2013). According to Anthrax members, guitarist Dimebag Darrell, who was killed Dec 8, 2004 on stage at a show for his new band Damage Plan, is and always will be the 6th Member of Anthrax.

History

1981–1992
Anthrax was originally formed in 1981 by Scott Ian, Dan Lilker and Dave Weiss. A few months later, John Connelly and Paul Kahn took over on vocals and bass, respectively, and Lilker switched to rhythm guitar. The band went through many lineup changes in its early stages – Connelly was replaced by Dirk Kennedy, followed by Ian's brother Jason Rosenfeld, then Tommy Wise; Greg Walls spent two years with the group on lead guitar (Ian switched to rhythm guitar), followed briefly by Bob Berry; Kahn was replaced by Kenny Kushner, before Lilker took over on bass when Walls joined; and Weiss was replaced by Greg D'Angelo. The band eventually settled in 1983 with a lineup including Ian and Lilker, lead vocalist Neil Turbin (who joined in August 1982), Dan Spitz (lead guitar, backing vocals) and Charlie Benante (drums).

After signing with Jon Zazula's new thrash metal label Megaforce Records later in the year, Anthrax recorded its debut album Fistful of Metal. Shortly after its January 1984 release, Turbin fired Lilker without consulting with the other members of the band, although Ian has since admitted that "there were issues" with the bassist. He was replaced by Frank Bello. Tensions continued to grow between Turbin and the rest of the group as they toured throughout 1984, leading to his eventual departure in August. The vocalist was briefly replaced by Matt Fallon, before Joey Belladonna joined later in the year. After recording four studio albums with the band, Belladonna was fired from Anthrax in 1992 due to stylistic changes the group intended to take, with John Bush taking his place.

1992 onwards
Dan Spitz left Anthrax in 1995 to become a professional watchmaker. Guitars on Stomp 442 were recorded by Ian, Benante, Paul Crook and Pantera's Dimebag Darrell. Crook remained with Anthrax for touring and recording after the release of Stomp 442, although never became an official member. He was replaced in August 2001 by former Boiler Room guitarist Rob Caggiano. Bello briefly left in March 2004 to join Helmet, with Joey Vera temporarily taking his place. It was announced in September 2005 that Belladonna, Spitz and Bello would return to Anthrax for a reunion tour and potentially new recordings. Alive 2 was recorded on the tour, but by January 2007 the reunion had fallen through as Belladonna had reportedly chosen not to continue working with the other members.

By the end of 2007, the group had enlisted Dan Nelson as its new lead vocalist and brought back Caggiano. However, after recording a new album with the band, Nelson left in July 2009 and was replaced for future tour dates by Bush. Belladonna returned to Anthrax the following year, making his first appearance at June's "big four" show and re-recording vocals on the album Worship Music. Caggiano left the band in January 2013, with Shadows Fall guitarist Jon Donais taking his place a week later.

Members

Current

Former

Touring

Timeline

Lineups

References

External links
Anthrax official website

Anthrax